Number 10 was a 1983 British television series originally aired on ITV and lasting for 7 episodes from 13 February to 27 March 1983. It depicted the personal and political lives of seven British Prime Ministers, ranging from the 1780s to the 1920s, during their occupancy of 10 Downing Street.

Cast
 Jeremy Brett as William Pitt the Younger
 Bernard Archard as Duke of Wellington
 Denis Quilley as William Gladstone
 Richard Pasco as Benjamin Disraeli
 David Langton as H. H. Asquith
 John Stride as David Lloyd George
 Ian Richardson as Ramsay MacDonald

References

External links

1980s British drama television series
1983 British television series debuts
1983 British television series endings
ITV television dramas
Television series by Yorkshire Television
English-language television shows
Cultural depictions of British prime ministers
Cultural depictions of William Pitt the Younger
Cultural depictions of Arthur Wellesley, 1st Duke of Wellington
Cultural depictions of Benjamin Disraeli
Cultural depictions of David Lloyd George
Cultural depictions of British men